John W. Rowell (June 9, 1835 – February 13, 1924) was a Vermont attorney and businessman.  He is notable for his service as an associate justice of the Vermont Supreme Court from 1882 to 1902, and chief justice from 1902 to 1913.

Early life
John W. Rowell was born in Lebanon, New Hampshire on June 9, 1835.  He was raised in Randolph, Vermont, educated in the schools of Randolph, and graduated from West Randolph Academy.  In 1856 he began to study law in the office of Jefferson P. Kidder; after Kidder moved from Vermont, Rowell continued to study in the office of Judge Edmund Weston.  Rowell also attended a course of instruction at the Ohio State and Union Law College of Poland, Ohio.

Start of career
Rowell was admitted to the bar in 1858, and began to practice in Randolph as the partner of Judge John B. Hutchinson.  He was a longtime member of the board of directors of the Northfield Bank, and was also active with the Randolph National Bank as a vice president and director.  A Republican, Rowell served in the Vermont House of Representatives in 1861 and 1862.  From 1862 to 1863 he served as state's attorney of Orange County.

After his partnership with John B. Hutchinson was dissolved in 1866, Rowell practiced alone in Randolph until 1870, when he moved to Chicago to practice as the partner of John Hutchinson, who was notable for his service as U.S. Consul in Nice, France and Secretary of the Dakota Territory.  In September 1871, Rowell decided to return to Randolph and continue practicing law.

Later career
From 1872 to 1880 Rowell was the reporter of decisions for the Vermont Supreme Court.  In 1874, Rowell was elected to the Vermont Senate, where he served one term and was chairman of the Judiciary Committee and the committee that oversaw operations at the state asylum for the insane.

In 1882, Vermont Chief Justice John Pierpont died and Associate Justice Homer E. Royce was appointed to succeed him.  Governor Roswell Farnham then appointed Rowell to succeed Royce as an associate justice.  Rowell served until 1902, when he was named to succeed Russell S. Taft as chief justice.  He served as chief justice until retiring in 1913, and was succeeded by George M. Powers.

Honors
In 1893, Rowell received the honorary degree of LL.D. from the University of Vermont.  In 1913 he received an LL.D. from Middlebury College.

Retirement and death
After retiring, Rowell continued to reside in Randolph, where he died on February 13, 1924.  He was buried at South View Cemetery in Randolph.

Family
In 1858, Rowell married Mary L. Wheeler (1832-1919), the daughter of Reverend Leonard Wheeler and Hannah (Gilman) Wheeler of Randolph.  They had no children.

References

Sources

Newspapers

Books

External links

1835 births
1924 deaths
People from Randolph, Vermont
Vermont lawyers
State's attorneys in Vermont
Republican Party members of the Vermont House of Representatives
Republican Party Vermont state senators
Justices of the Vermont Supreme Court
Burials in Vermont
U.S. state supreme court judges admitted to the practice of law by reading law
19th-century American lawyers